The 2024 UEFA Women's Champions League Final will be the final match of the 2023–24 UEFA Women's Champions League, the 23rd season of Europe's premier women's club football tournament organised by UEFA, and the 15th season since it was renamed from the UEFA Women's Cup to the UEFA Women's Champions League. The match will be played at the San Mamés in Bilbao, Spain, between 24 and 26 May 2024.

Venue

Host selection
On 16 July 2021, the UEFA Executive Committee announced that due to the loss of hosting rights for UEFA Euro 2020, San Mamés in Bilbao was given hosting rights for the 2024 final and the 2025 UEFA Europa League Final. This was part of a settlement agreement by UEFA to recognise the efforts and financial investment made to host UEFA Euro 2020.

Match

Details
The "home" team (for administrative purposes) will be determined by an additional draw (after the quarter-final and semi-final draws), at the UEFA headquarters in Nyon, Switzerland.

See also
2024 UEFA Champions League Final
2024 UEFA Europa League Final
2024 UEFA Europa Conference League Final

References

External links

2024
Final
Scheduled association football competitions
May 2024 sports events in Europe

International club association football competitions hosted by Spain
International women's association football competitions hosted by Spain
2024 UEFA Women's Champions League Final